The Carlsen-Nakamura rivalry is a chess rivalry that exists between grandmasters Magnus Carlsen and Hikaru Nakamura. Considered to be one of the best in the entire sport and definitional of an era, it features two of the most recognizable faces in modern chess. The rivalry has been compared to the famous Messi-Ronaldo rivalry.

Carlsen and Nakamura have been dominant in the chess world for more than a decade, with Carlsen being the highest rated chess player in history and a 5 time world champion, and Nakamura tied for 10th while being a two time World Championship candidate and the reigning Fischer Random World Champion. The two have also dominated quick chess, with Carlsen being a 4 time World Rapid Chess Champion and a 6 time World Blitz Chess Champion, while Nakamura has been ranked number 1 or near number 1 in both blitz and Rapid since FIDE started publishing the lists, and has won all of the last five Chess.com Speed Chess Championships, beating Carlsen in the most recent one. The two regularly meet in Chess.com Titled Tuesday tournaments, are regularly rated over 3200 in blitz on chess.com and even exhibition games between the two are highly anticipated.

According to chessgames.com database, as of 2023, Carlsen leads head to head against Nakamura in Classical games, 14 to 1 with 25 draws. In quicker games and exhibition games, Carlsen leads 87 to 37 with 114 draws.

History

Prior to 2016, Hikaru Nakamura had never beaten Magnus Carlsen in a Classical game of chess, doing so with the black pieces at the 2016 Bilbao Masters. As of 2023, this remains Nakamura's only victory against Carlsen in Classical Chess.

The rivalry has earned comparisons to the other great rivalries in sports history, like the Federer–Nadal rivalry in tennis, or the Messi-Ronaldo rivalry in soccer. In 2022 ahead of the 2022 FIFA World Cup, Cristiano Ronaldo and Lionel Messi posted a picture for an advertisement where they posed playing chess. The position on the board was taken from a game played between Carlsen and Nakamura.

2019 World Blitz Chess Championship
At the 2019, World Blitz Chess Championship, Magnus and Hikaru could not be separated at the end of the regular tournament. Two additional tiebreak games were necessary, where Magnus Carlsen prevailed, earning his 5th title and 3rd in a row.

2022 World Fischer Random Championship
On his way to winning the 2022 World Fischer Random Championship in a tight final against Ian Nepomniachtchi, Hikaru met Magnus Carlsen in a mini match on day 1 of the tournament. The first game ended in a draw, while in the second game, Magnus Carlsen made an uncharacteristic blunder costing him the game and giving Hikaru the win.

2022 Speed Chess Championship
Just a few hours after the 2022 FIFA World Cup Final, Magnus Carlsen and Hikaru Nakamura met in chess.com's Speed Chess Championship final. Carlsen entered the match having beaten Nakamura in the 2016, 2017 editions, while Hikaru entered the match being undefeated by Magnus in all of 2022. The match started off with Hikaru taking an early lead and capitalizing on several blunders by Carlsen, however, the match equalized and was close until the end, with Nakamura prevailing after taking a one-point lead and Carlsen being unable to finish the last game in time.

2023 Airthings Masters
In the 2023 Airthings Masters, Carlsen met Nakamura twice. In the first match, all games were drawn but Carlsen won due to Armageddon rules. In the second match, Carlsen won the first game, and Nakamura missed a chance to win the third game, thus giving Carlsen the victory.

Relationship between Carlsen and Nakamura
Nakamura has stated that despite their strong rivalry and intense matches, the two have an amicable relationship stemming from their mutual respect.
Carlsen has on numerous occasions praised Hikaru as a strong player.

The two have also shared multiple humorous moments. On March 15, 2021, Magnus Carlsen, playing white, led with the Bongcloud Attack in a game against Nakamura at the Magnus Carlsen Invitational. Nakamura mirrored the opening with 2. ... Ke7, leading to a position nicknamed the "Double Bongcloud". The game was intentionally drawn by threefold repetition after the players immediately repeated moves, the particular sequence they used known as the "Hotbox Variation". The game occurred in the last round of the preliminary stage of the tournament, and both players had already qualified for the following knockout stage, making the game dead rubber. It marked the first recorded occurrence of 1. e4 e5 2. Ke2 Ke7 in a major tournament.

References

Chess rivalries